Jo Hyun-woo (Hangul: 조현우) (born March 30, 1994 in Gunsan, North Jeolla) is a South Korean pitcher for the KT Wiz in the Korea Baseball Organization (KBO). He previously played in KBO for the Lotte Giants.

References 

KT Wiz players
Lotte Giants players
KBO League pitchers
South Korean baseball players
1994 births
Living people
People from Gunsan
Sportspeople from North Jeolla Province